The Scottish Gaelic Texts Society is a text publication society established "to provide the publication of texts in the Scottish Gaelic language, accompanied by such introductions, English translations, glossaries and notes as may be deemed desirable." It was established in 1934.

Selected publications
 The Songs of John MacCodrum, bard to Sir James MacDonald of Sleat, edited by William Matheson.  1938.
 Heroic Poetry from the Book of the Dean of Lismore, edited by Neil Ross.  1939.
 Prose writings of Donald MacKinnon 1839-1914, edited by Lachlan Mackinnon.  1956.
 Òrain agus Luinneagan Gàidhlig le Màiri nighean Alasdair Ruaidh. Gaelic Songs of Mary Macleod, edited by James Carmichael Watson.  1965, 1982.

See also
 Scottish Text Society

References 

1934 establishments in Scotland
Text publication societies
Scottish Gaelic literature